Dianne Margaret de Leeuw (born 19 November 1955) is a Dutch-American former competitive figure skater who represented the Netherlands. She is the 1975 World champion, the 1976 European champion, and the 1976 Olympic silver medalist.

Personal life
De Leeuw was born in Orange, California, United States to a Dutch mother and a father with dual United States and Dutch citizenship. She married her former coach, Doug Chapman.

Career 
Since there were few international opportunities for U.S. skaters, de Leeuw's mother decided she should try to compete for the Netherlands. She won her first national title in the 1970–71 season and was assigned to the 1971 European Championships in Zürich, where she placed 19th. To gain a berth to the 1972 Winter Olympics, de Leeuw was required to finish in the top ten at the 1972 European Championships. She managed to place ninth and made her Olympic debut, finishing 16th. She then made her first appearance at the World Championships.

De Leeuw's international breakthrough came in the 1973–74 season. Her first ISU Championship medal was silver at the 1974 European Championships in Zagreb, behind Christine Errath. At the 1974 World Championships in Munich, she was awarded the bronze medal and stepped onto the podium with Errath and Dorothy Hamill.

In 1975, de Leeuw repeated as silver medalist at the European Championships in Copenhagen, while Errath again won gold. She became World champion at the 1975 World Championships in Colorado Springs, Colorado, finishing ahead of Hamill and Errath, and was voted the 1975 Dutch female athlete of the year.

De Leeuw won gold at the 1974 European Championships in Geneva. At the 1976 Winter Olympics in Innsbruck, she carried the Dutch flag and made daily trips to Germany for ice time. She received the silver medal, while Hamill and Errath obtained gold and bronze respectively. After taking bronze at the 1976 World Championships in Gothenburg, de Leeuw retired from ISU competition. She toured with Holiday on Ice and the Ice Follies and then became a coach, working at the Westminster Ice Palace in Westminster, California and Anaheim Ice.

Results

References

External links

 Coaching biography

1955 births
Living people
Sportspeople from Orange, California
Dutch female single skaters
Figure skaters at the 1972 Winter Olympics
Figure skaters at the 1976 Winter Olympics
Olympic figure skaters of the Netherlands
Olympic silver medalists for the Netherlands
Olympic medalists in figure skating
World Figure Skating Championships medalists
European Figure Skating Championships medalists
American sportswomen
Medalists at the 1976 Winter Olympics
21st-century American women